Jason Garrett Sauter (born June 22, 1962) is an American former professional stock car racing driver. He previously drove the No. 34 Chevrolet Monte Carlo for Frank Cicci Racing in the Busch Series. Sauter is the son of former NASCAR driver Jim Sauter, and the brother of fellow drivers Tim Sauter and Johnny Sauter. He also is an uncle to Travis Sauter (son of Tim).

Racing career
Sauter, a former American Speed Association driver, made his NASCAR debut in 1996 in the Craftsman Truck Series. Driving the No. 42 Team SABCO Chevrolet Silverado, he qualified 21st and finished eighth at the Miami-Dade Homestead Motorsports Complex. He ran six more races for SABCO that year. His best finish was third at Bristol Motor Speedway, and was offered a ride for one of SABCO's Cup teams, but he chose to decline the offer. He ended the season driving the No. 03 RealTree Camouflage Chevy for Richard Childress Racing at Las Vegas Motor Speedway, finishing 22nd.

In 1997, Sauter replaced Mike Skinner in Childress' No. 3 GM Goodwrench entry in the truck series. Sauter won his first career race at New Hampshire Motor Speedway. He had 15 top-10 finishes that season and finished sixth in the final points standings. In 1998, Sauter picked up his second career win at Martinsville Speedway and moved up to a career-high fourth in points. The next year, he won at Louisville and Texas but dropped to fifth in points.

In 2000, Sauter moved up to the Busch Series, driving the No. 43 Quality Farm & Country Stores Chevrolet Monte Carlo for the Curb Agajanian Performance Group. He had eight top-10 finishes, was 17th in the championship points, and was fourth in the Rookie of the Year chase. In 2001, Sauter won his first career pole at Kentucky Speedway. At Memphis, Sauter had a chance to pick up his first Busch Series win; but with two laps to go, Jeff Green drove hard in to turn 3, and both cars washed up the track, allowing Randy LaJoie to slip by for the win. Despite the great run for Sauter, he was released from the team after this race. He missed the next two races at Phoenix and Rockingham before getting a ride in the No. 25 U.S. Marine Corps Chevrolet for Ed Rensi.

For 2002, Sauter returned to RCR and shared the No. 21 Rockwell Automation Chevy with Jeff Green. In 13 starts with RCR, his best finish was a fourth at Nashville Superspeedway. He concluded the season driving the No. 02 Ford Taurus for Angela's Motorsports, finishing 25th at the Ford 300. He also made his Winston Cup debut in the No. 71 for Marcis Auto Racing, finishing 37th at Texas and 43rd at Talladega Superspeedway. In 2003, he ran 10 races for Henderson Bros. Racing, finishing ninth at Nashville. In 2004, he ran nine races for the Henderson brothers, his best finish a 13th at Richmond International Raceway. He also returned to the truck series, driving four races in the No. 06 for MRD Motorsports and finishing 15th at Bristol.

After making only one start in the Busch Series in 2005, Sauter returned in 2006 with a new team, Duesenberg & Leik Motorsports. He qualified for 33 of 35 races with a best finish of seventh at O'Reilly Raceway Park. After the No. 01 team merged with Davis Motorsports, Sauter joined Frank Cicci Racing in 2007, running a few races before the team suspended operations.

Sauter currently competes in local races on short tracks in Wisconsin.

Motorsports career results

NASCAR
(key) (Bold – Pole position awarded by qualifying time. Italics – Pole position earned by points standings or practice time. * – Most laps led.)

Winston Cup Series

Busch Series

Craftsman Truck Series

References

External links
 

Living people
1962 births
American Speed Association drivers
People from Necedah, Wisconsin
Racing drivers from Wisconsin
NASCAR drivers
Richard Childress Racing drivers